Thomas Alison Scott (1865 - 21 October 1946) was a member of the Queensland Legislative Assembly.

Early life
Scott was born at Maitland, New South Wales, the son of Andrew Scott and his wife Christina (née Brodie). He took up pastoral pursuits and by 1922 was a hotel manager. In 1937 he was working as a caretaker in Mooloolah.

On the 27 Oct 1887 he married Eva Zerbe (died 1914) with the marriage producing five sons and three daughters. Scott died in October 1946 and his funeral moved from the funeral parlour of K.M. Smith at Fortitude Valley to the Lutwyche Cemetery.

Public life
Scott, representing the Labour Party, won the seat of Murilla in the Queensland Legislative Assembly at the 1904 Queensland state election. He held the seat until 1907 by which time he had joined the Kidstonites.

References

Members of the Queensland Legislative Assembly
1865 births
1946 deaths
Burials at Lutwyche Cemetery
Australian Labor Party members of the Parliament of Queensland